Neiwan is a railway station on the Taiwan Railways Administration Neiwan line located in Hengshan Township, Hsinchu County, Taiwan.

History
The station was opened on 11 September 1951.

Around the station
 Liu Hsing-chin Comic Museum
 Neiwan Theater

Nearby stations
 <-- Neiwan line

See also
 List of railway stations in Taiwan

References

1951 establishments in Taiwan
Railway stations in Hsinchu County
Railway stations opened in 1951
Railway stations served by Taiwan Railways Administration